Jayaprakash Narayan Nagar, popularly known as J. P. Nagar, is one of the residential layouts in Mysore, under Krishnaraja Constituency, that is very adjacent to the outer ring road. 
J.P. Nagar was originally meant to be an industrial layout.  But recently it has become an important residential area with many shops and establishments catering to the residents.

J.P.Nagar Library and Stadium

The J.P.Nagar Library near to police booth  has an extensive collection of English and Kannada books.  It has got a very spacious reading space with special facilities for the child reader.  There is a yoga center on the first floor of the library.  A special niche park called Sri Puttaraj Gawai Stadium is attached to the library and there is a 500-meter walking track, a tennis court and an  open-air auditorium adjacent to the library. There are facilities for playing cricket, handball, basketball, table tennis,Tennis -clay and football.  The swimming pool was built by Build-Operate-Transfer scheme and it has a short course of eight lines.  There is another indoor pool of three lines.  A gymnasium and a skating ring are also included in the facility.

Speciality Parks
The stadium also has two speciality parks on either side of the library building.  One is a children's park with all playing facilities.  Another is a niche park for couples and philosophers with a lot of privacy included.

Areas nearer to J.P.Nagar
 Chamundipuram, Vishweshwara Nagar and Shanidevara temple
 Vidyaranyapura and Goblimara
 Policebooth and Kavitha bakery
 JP Nagar last bus stop
 Nanchana Halli Palaya
  JP Nagar sports club
 Navodaya layout

See also
 Mysore South
 Gurur
 Vidyaranyapura, Mysore
 Ashokapuram, Mysore
 Nanju Mallige
 Mananthavady Road

Mysore South
Suburbs of Mysore